Tarnee Tester (born 22 January 1993) is an Australian rules footballer who played for West Coast and Fremantle in the AFL Women's (AFLW).

Early Life
Tester was born and raised in Broken Hill of indigenous Barkindji heritage. Tester began playing football in 2012 with West Broken Hill. Tester moved to Perth to pursue a career in the AFLW.

AFLW career

West Coast
 In August 2020, Tester was delisted by West Coast.

Fremantle
In August 2020, Tester was signed by Fremantle in the delisted free agency period. Following the 2021 season, she was delisted by Fremantle.

References

External links

 

Living people
1993 births
West Coast Eagles (AFLW) players
Australian rules footballers from New South Wales
Sportswomen from New South Wales
Indigenous Australian players of Australian rules football